Turuf is a rural locality (a selo) in Tinitsky Selsoviet, Tabasaransky District, Republic of Dagestan, Russia. The population was 389 as of 2010. There are 8 streets.

Geography 
Turuf is located 11 km southeast of Khuchni (the district's administrative centre) by road. Dzhugdil is the nearest rural locality.

References 

Rural localities in Tabasaransky District